This article lists the in the water and on the water forms of aquatic sports for 2020.

2020 Summer Olympics (Aquatics)
 April 21 – 26: 2020 FINA Diving World Cup in  Tokyo
 April 30 – May 3: FINA Artistic Swimming Olympic Games Qualification Tournament 2020 in  Tokyo
 May 30 – 31: FINA Olympic Marathon Swim Qualifier 2020 in  Fukuoka

2020 Summer Paralympics (Swimming)

International and continental competitions
 March 21 – April 5: 2020 South American Swimming Championships in  Mar del Plata
 April 18 – 24: 2020 African Swimming Championships in 
 May 11 – 24: 2020 European Aquatics Championships in  Budapest
 June 15 – 21: 2020 Oceania Swimming Championships in  Suva
 November 7 – 17: 2020 Asian Swimming Championships in  New Clark City
 TBD for December: 2020 FINA World Swimming Championships (25 m) in  Abu Dhabi

Artistic swimming

FINA Artistic Swimming Olympic Games Qualification Tournament 2020 
 April 30 – May  3: in  Tokyo

2020 FINA Artistic Swimming World Series 
 March 6 – 8: ASWS #1 in  Paris
 March 27 – 29: ASWS #2 in  Hurghada
 April 3 – 5: ASWS #3 in  Alexandroupolis
 April 10 – 12: ASWS #4 in  Budapest
 April 17 – 19: ASWS #5 in  Kazan
 April 23 – 25: ASWS #6 in  Suzhou
 May 29 – 31: ASWS #7 in  Madrid
 June 12 – 14: ASWS #8 in  Ypsilanti
 June 19 – 21: ASWS #9 (Super Final) in  Windsor

FINA World Junior Artistic Swimming Championships 2020 
 August 24 – 30: 2020 FINA World Junior Synchronised Swimming Championships in  Quebec City

Canoeing

2020 Summer Olympics (Canoeing)
 March 26 – 29: 2020 Canoe Sprint Asian Olympic Qualifier in  Pattaya
 May 6 & 7: 2020 Canoe Sprint European Olympic Qualifier in  Račice
 May 21 – 24: 2020 ICF Canoe Sprint Final Olympic Qualifier in  Duisburg
 July 26 – August 8: Canoeing at the 2020 Summer Olympics in  Tokyo
 July 26 – 31: Canoe slalom
 August 3 – 8: Canoe sprint

2020 Summer Paralympics (Paracanoeing)
 May 21 – 24: 2020 ICF Paracanoe World Championships & Paralympic Qualifier in  Duisburg

World canoeing championships
 July 7: 2020 ICF Junior & Canoe Slalom World  in  Ljubljana / Tacen
 July 10 – 12: 2020 Canoe Sprint Non-Olympic Events World Championships in  Szeged
 July 16 – 19: 2020 ICF Junior & Canoe Sprint World  in  Brandenburg
 August 14 – 16: 2020 ICF Masters Canoe Sprint World Championship  in  Ternopil
 September 24 – 27: 2020 Canoe Slalom Non-Olympic Events World Championships in  Markkleeberg

Canoe sprint

2020 ICF Canoe Sprint Olympic Qualifier 

May 21 – 22: in  Duisburg, Germany

2020 continental canoe sprint championships 
 February 14 – 16: 2020 Oceania Canoe Sprint Championships (Olympic Qualifier) in  Penrith
 March 26 – 29: 2020 Asian Canoe Sprint Championships (Olympic Qualifier) in  Pattaya
 May 7 – 10: 2020 Pan American Canoe Sprint Championships (Olympic Qualifier) in  Curauma
 June 4 – 7: 2020 Canoe Sprint European Championships in  Bascov
 July 2 – 5: 2020 ECA Junior And U23 Canoe Sprint European Championships in  Moscow

2020 Canoe Sprint World Cup 
 May 7 – 10: CSWC #1 in  Račice
 May 21 – 24: CSWC #2 (final) in  Duisburg

Canoe slalom

2020 International Canoe Slalom Championships 
 February 1 – 3: 2020 Oceania Canoe Slalom Championships (Olympic Qualifier) in  Auckland
 March 22 – 24: 2020 Asian Canoe Slalom Championships (Olympic Qualifier) in  Pattaya
 April 3 – 5: 2020 Pan-American Canoe Slalom Championships (Olympic Qualifier) in  Rio de Janeiro (Cancelled)
 May 15 – 17: 2020 European Canoe Slalom Championships (Olympic Qualifier) at  Lee Valley White Water Centre (Cancelled)
 June 6–7: 2020 European Open Canoe Slalom Championships in  Merano
 August 13 – 16: ECA Junior and U23 Canoe Slalom European Championships in  Krakow
 September 18 – 20: 2020 European Canoe Slalom Championships (Olympic Qualifier) at  Prague-Troja Canoeing Centre

2020 Canoe Slalom World Cup 
 June 5 – 7: CSWC #1 in  Ivrea (Cancelled)
 June 12 – 14: CSWC #2 in  Pau (Postponed to November 6 – 8)
 August 21 – 23: CSWC #3 in  Liptovský Mikuláš (Cancelled)
 September 18 – 20: CSWC #4 in  Prague (Cancelled)
 September 24 – 27: CSWC #5 (final) in  Markkleeberg (Cancelled)
 September 16 – 18: CSWC #1 in  Tacen (Replacement for Cancelled Ivrea World Cup)

2020 Canoe Slalom European Cup 
 June 1: EJCCS #1 in  Valstagna
 June 13 – 14: EJCCS #2 in  Valstagna

Canoe Marathon

2020 International Canoe Marathon Championships 
 August 24 – 25: 2020 ICF Masters Canoe Marathon World in  Baerum
 August 27 – 30: 2020 ICF Canoe Marathon World in  Baerum

2020 Canoe Marathon Cup 
 May 24 – 27:ICF Canoe Marathon World Cup in  Pitesti

2020 Continental Championship Canoe Marathon Cup 
 July 23 – 26: 2020 ECA Canoe Marathon European in  Budapest

Canoe Ocean Racing

2020 International Canoe Ocean Racing Worlds 
 September 5 & 6:  in  Nantahala

Canoe Polo

2020 International Canoe Polo Championships 
 September 8 – 13: 2020 ICF Canoe Polo World Championship in  Viana do Castelo

2020 Continental Championship Canoe Polo 
 September 24 – 26: 2020 European Clubs Championship Canoe Polo in  TBD

2020 Continental Canoe Polo Cup 
 July 23 – 26: 2020 ECA CUP I Canoe Polo in  Mechelen

Dragon Boat

2020 International Dragon Boat Championships 
 September 8 – 13: 2020 ICF Dragon Boat World Championship in  Bilawali Lake / Indore

Wildwater Canoe

2020 International Wildwater Canoe Championships 
 April 26 – 30: 2020 ICF Wildwater Canoe World Championship in  Nantahala

2020 Continental Wildwater Canoe Cup 
 May 3 – 4: 2020 ICF Wildwater Canoe World Cups 1–2 in  Albright
 May 8 – 8: 2020 ICF Wildwater Canoe World Cups 3–4 in  Albright

Diving

2020 FINA Diving World Cup 
 April 21 – 26: in  Tokyo

2020 FINA Diving World Series 
 February 28 – March 1: DWS #1 in  Montreal
 March 6 – 8: DWS #2 in  Beijing
 March 20 – 22: DWS #3 in  Kazan
 March 27 – 29: DWS #4 (final) in  London

2020 FINA Diving Grand Prix 
 February 14 – 16: DGP #1 in  Madrid
 February 20 – 23: DGP #2 in  Rostock
 May 14 – 17: DGP #3 in  Windsor
 May 28 – 31: DGP #4 in  Singapore
 June 5 – 7: DGP #5 in  Kuala Lumpur
 June 17 – 20: DGP #6 in  Cairo
 July 3 – 5: DGP #7 in  Bolzano
 November 6 – 8: DGP #8 (final) in  Gold Coast

2020 FINA Diving Grand Prix 
November 29 – December 6: in  Kyiv

High diving

FINA High Diving World Cup 2020 
 July 11 – 12: in  Kazan

2020 Red Bull Cliff Diving World Series 
 May 16: in  Bali, Indonesia
 June 6: in  Tour Saint-Nicolas, La Rochelle, France
 June 27: in  Possum Kingdom Lake, Fort Worth, United States
 July 19: in  Pietro L'Abbate's Terrace, Polignano a Mare, Italia
 August 15: in  Oslo, Norway
 September 6: in  São Miguel, Vila Franca do Campo, Azores
 September 26: in  Stari Most, Mostar
 October 7: in  Sydney, Australia

Marathon swimming

2020 FINA Marathon Swim World Series 
 February 15: MSWS #1 in  Doha
 May 3: MSWS #2 in  Victoria
 June 6: MSWS #3 in  Budapest
 June 13: MSWS #4 in  Setúbal
 July 23: MSWS #5 in  Lac Saint-Jean
 August 8: MSWS #6 in  Lake Mégantic
 August 30: MSWS #7 in  Ohrid
 September 19: MSWS #8 in  Nantou City
 October 16: MSWS #9 in  Hangzhou
 October 25: MSWS #10 (final) in  Hong Kong

2020 FINA Ultra Marathon Swim Series 
 February 15: MSWS #1 in  Rosario (TBC)
 February 23: UMSS #1 in  Santa Fe
 July 25: UMSS #2 in  Lac Saint-Jean
 August 22: UMSS #3 in  Ohrid
 August 29: UMSS #4 in  Novi
 September 9: UMSS #5 (final) in  Capri / Napoli

FINA Olympic Marathon Swim Qualifier 2020 
 May 30–31: in  Fukuoka

FINA World Junior Open Water Swimming Championships 2020 
 August 21–23: in  Victoria

Rowing

2020 Summer Olympics (Rowing)
 April 2 – 5: 2020 FISA Americas Olympic Qualification Regatta in  Rio de Janeiro
 April 27 – 29: 2020 FISA European Olympic Qualification Regatta in  Varese
 April 27 – 30: 2020 FISA Asia & Oceania Olympic Qualification Regatta in  Chungju
 May 17 – 19: 2020 FISA Final Olympic Qualification Regatta in  Lucerne
 July 24 – 31: Rowing at the 2020 Summer Olympics in  Tokyo

2020 Summer Paralympics (Rowing)
 May 8 – 10: 2020 FISA Final Paralympic Qualification Regatta in  Gavirate
 August 27 – 29: Rowing at the 2020 Summer Paralympics in  Tokyo

International rowing events
 January 11: 2020 European Rowing Indoor Championships in  Prague
 February 7 & 8: 2020 World Rowing Indoor Championships in  Paris
 June 5 – 7: 2020 European Rowing Championships in  Poznań
 August 16 – 23: 2020 World Rowing Championships in  Bled
 August 16 – 23: 2020 World Rowing Junior Championships in  Bled
 August 16 – 23: 2020 World Rowing Under 23 Championships in  Bled
 August 27 – 29: 2020 World University Rowing Championships in  Zagreb
 September 2 – 6: 2020 World Rowing Masters Regatta in  Linz-Ottensheim

2020 World Rowing Cup
 April 10 – 12: WRC #1 in  Sabaudia
 May 1 – 3: WRC #2 in  Varese
 May 22 – 24: WRC #3 (final) in  Lucerne

Sailing

2020 Summer Olympics (Sailing)

International sailing events
 June 30 – July 4: 2020 World University Sailing Championships in  Campione del Garda
 November 8, 2020 – TBA for 2021: 2020–21 Vendée Globe
 TBA: 2020 Youth Sailing World Championships (location TBA)
 TBA: 2020 Youth Match Racing World Championships (location TBA)
 TBA: 2020 Women's Match Racing World Championship (location TBA)
 TBA: 2020 Transat Québec–Saint-Malo

2020 Sailing World Cup
 August 25 – September 1, 2019: SWC #1 in  Enoshima
 January 19 – 26: SWC #2 in  Miami
 April 13 – 19: SWC #3 in  Genoa
 June 14 – 21: SWC #4 (final) in  Enoshima

470
 January 8 – 12: 2020 470 North American Championship in  Coconut Grove Sailing Club (Miami)
 January 12 – 18: 2020 470 African Championship in  Clube Náutico da Ilha de Luanda
 February 11 – 17: 2020 470 South American Championship (location TBA)
 March 13 – 21: 2020 470 World Championships in  Club Nàutic S'Arenal (Mallorca)
 May 2 – 9: 2020 470 European Championships in  Base Nautique Municipale (Hyères)
 July 12 – 19: 2020 470 Junior World Championships in  Gdynia Marina
 August 2 – 9: 2020 470 Junior European Championship in  Warnemünder Segel-Club (Warnemünde)
 August 4 – 9: 2020 470 Masters Cup in  Warnemünde

49er
 January 30 – February 3: 2020 49er Oceania Championship in  Geelong
 February 9 – 15: 2020 49er & 49er FX World Championships in  Geelong
 August 18 – 24: 2020 49er Junior (U23) World Championship in  Lake Como
 August 27 – 29: 2020 49er Masters World Championship in  Lake Como

Finn
 May 9 – 16: 2020 Finn Gold Cup in  Palma de Mallorca (Trofeo Princesa Sofia)
 TBA for August: 2020 Finn Silver Cup in  Gdynia
 TBA for September: 2020 Finn European Masters in  Gdynia
 TBA for September: 2020 Finn European Championship in  Gdynia
 TBA: 2020 Finn World Masters in  Port Zeeland

Laser
 February 9 – 16: 2020 ILCA Laser Standard Men's World Championship in  Melbourne
 February 21 – 28: 2020 Laser Radial World Championship for Men and Women in  Melbourne
 March 19 – 28: 2020 ILCA Laser Masters World Championships in  Geelong
 July 17 – 24: 2020 ILCA Under-21 World Championships in  Malcesine
 July 26 – August 3: 2020 ILCA 4.7 Youth World Championships in  Arco
 August 22 – 30: 2020 ILCA Radial Youth World Championships in  Dziwnów

Nacra 17
 January 30 – February 3: 2020 Nacra 17 Oceania Championship in  Geelong
 February 9 – 16: 2020 Nacra 17 World Championship in  Geelong
 August 18 – 24: 2020 Nacra 17 Junior (U23) World Championship in  Lake Como

RS:X
 February 9 – 15: 2020 RS:X Windsurfing South American Championships (Olympic Qualifier) in  Mar del Plata
 February 23 – 29: 2020 RS:X Windsurfing World Championships in  Auckland
 March 15 – 22: 2020 RS:X Windsurfing Asian Championships (Olympic Qualifier) in  Abu Dhabi
 May 10 – 16: 2020 RS:X European & Youth European Championships and Open Trophy in  Aigio
 August 23 – 29: 2020 RS:X Windsurfing Youth World Championships in  Cádiz

Surfing

Australian Grand Slam of Surfing
 Tweed Coast Pro
 Boost Mobile Pro Gold Coast
 Margaret River Pro

2020 Summer Olympics (Surfing)

International competitions
 March 11 – 15: 2020 ISA World Para Surfing Championship in  La Jolla, California
 TBA: 2020 ISA World Junior Surfing Championship
 TBA: 2020 ISA World SUP and Paddleboard Championship
 TBA: 2020 ISA World Longboard Surfing Championship

Swimming

2020 FINA Champions Swim Series 
 January 14 & 15: CSS #1 in  Shenzhen
 January 18 & 19: CSS #2 (final) in  Beijing

2020 FINA Swimming World Cup 
 September 4 – 6: SWC #1 in  Singapore (TBC)
 September 10 – 12: SWC #2 in  Jinan
 October 2 – 4: SWC #3 in  Kazan
 October 8 – 10: SWC #4 in  Doha
 October 23 – 25: SWC #5 in  Berlin
 October 30 – November 1: SWC #6 (final) in  Budapest

2020–21 International Swimming League 
 September – April, 2021: 2020–21 ISL regular season (locations TBA)

Water polo

2020 Summer Olympics (Water polo)
 March 22 – 29: 2020 Men's Water Polo Olympic Games Qualification Tournament in  Rotterdam

2020 FINA Men's Water Polo World League
 October 17, 2019 – April 28, 2020: 2019–20 FINA Men's European Water Polo Preliminary Rounds
 April 28 – May 3: 2020 FINA Men's Intercontinental Water Polo Tournament in the  Indianapolis
 June 23 – 28: 2020 FINA Men's Water Polo World League Superfinal (location TBA)

2020 FINA Women's Water Polo World League
 November 19, 2019 – April 28, 2020: 2019–20 FINA Women's European Water Polo Preliminary Rounds
 April 28 – May 3: 2020 FINA Women's Intercontinental Water Polo Tournament in the  Indianapolis
 June 9 – 14: 2020 FINA Women's Water Polo League Superfinal (location TBA)

FINA World Water Polo events
 July 5 – 12: 2020 FINA World U16 Water Polo Cup in  Volos-Larissa
 September 5 – 13: 2020 FINA World Women's Youth Water Polo Championships in  Netanya

Ligue Européenne de Natation (Water polo)
 January 12 – 26: 2020 European Water Polo Championship for Men & Women in  Budapest
 August 23 – 30: 2020 LEN European Women's U19 Water Polo Championship in  Rome
 September 6 – 13: 2020 LEN European Men's U19 Water Polo Championship in  Volos

LEN Club events
 August 30, 2019 – June 7, 2020: 2019–20 LEN Champions League
 September 13, 2019 – May 9, 2020: 2019–20 LEN Euro Cup
 October 31, 2019 – April 25, 2020: 2019–20 LEN Euro League Women
 TBA: 2020 LEN Super Cup
 TBA: 2019–20 Women's LEN Trophy
 TBA: 2020 Women's LEN Super Cup

Water skiing & Wakeboarding

IWWF World Championships
 March 21 & 22: 2020 IWWF World Waterski Show Tournament in  Mulwala
 April 11 – 18: 2020 IWWF World Barefoot Waterski Championships in  Liverpool (Sydney)
 August 18 – 23: 2020 IWWF World Junior Waterski Championships in  Santa Rosa Beach, Florida
 September 14 – 20: 2020 IWWF World Cable Wakeboard Championships in  Pathum Thani
 September 14 – 20: 2020 IWWF World Over 35 Waterski Championships in  Baurech
 September 22 – 27: 2020 FISU World University Waterski & Wakeboard Championships in  Dnipro

IWWF Continental Championships
 August 4 – 8: 2020 IWWF Europe and Africa Youth Waterski Championships in  Seseña
 August 23 – 30: 2020 IWWF Europe and Africa Waterski Racing Championships in  Beringen (to be confirmed)
 August 27 – 30: 2020 IWWF Europe and Africa 35+ Waterski Championships in  Ravenna
 September 1 – 6: 2020 IWWF Asian Waterski & Wakesports Championships in  Chuncheon
 September 2 – 6: 2020 IWWF Europe & Africa Cable Wakeboard and Wakeskate Championships in  Beckum

IWWF World Cup/Elite events
 June 5 – 7: 2020 MasterCraft TBD in  Zachary, Louisiana
 June 12 & 13: 2020 Malibu Open in  Charleston, South Carolina
 June 26 – 28: 2020 BOTASKI Pro Am in  Seseña
 July 3 – 5: 2020 VII San Gervasio Pro Am in  San Gervasio Bresciano
 July 10 – 12: 2020 Kaiafas Battle Pro Am in  Kaiafas Lake
 August 15 & 16: 2020 Hilltop Lake ProAm by Syndicate Waterskis in  Arlington, Washington

References

See also

 2020 in swimming
 2020 in sports

 
Water sports by year
Aquatic sports
Aquatics